The Greatest Gift is a 1943 short story written by Philip Van Doren Stern, which became the basis for the film It's a Wonderful Life. The Greatest Gift may also refer to:

Film and television
The Greatest Gift (TV series), an American soap opera  broadcast from 1954 to 1955
The Greatest Gift (film), a 1974 American television drama film starring Glenn Ford
The Greatest Gift (2018), film by Juan Manuel Cotelo
"The Greatest Gift", the 13th episode of the third season of Warehouse 13

Music

Albums
The Greatest Gift (Scratch Acid album), a 1991 album by Scratch Acid
The Greatest Gift, a 1999 album by Liberty 37 
The Greatest Gift: An Album Of Christmas Classics, a 2004 album by Charlie Landsborough
The Greatest Gift: Songs of the Season, a 2009 album by Alexis Cole
The Greatest Gift (mixtape), a 2017 mixtape by Sufjan Stevens

Songs
"The Greatest Gift", a 1966 song by Cassietta George
"The Greatest Gift", a 1975 song by Henry Mancini
"The Greatest Gift", a 1976 song by Narvel Felts
"The Greatest Gift", a 1993 song by Robert Plant from his album Fate of Nations
"Greatest Gift", a 1994 song by Tina Arena